Kenneth Sola (born 25 August 1985) is a Norwegian footballer who plays as a defender for Sandnes Ulf.

Career
Sola hails from Tjelta. He played for IL Havdur, Viking FK and Skeid, before moving to the Norwegian First Division side Stavanger IF in 2006. He played two Norwegian Cup matches for Viking, but did none in the Tippeligaen. He played 82 goals and scored 15 goals for Stavanger IF.

Sola relocated to the United States in 2010 when he signed to play for the Real Maryland Monarchs in the USL Second Division. He made his debut for the team on 17 April 2010 in the team's 2010 season opener against the Pittsburgh Riverhounds.

Joining Sandnes Ulf in mid-2010, he took part in their promotion from the 2011 1. divisjon. After the 2017 season he semi-retired, continuing as player-coach for Havdur on the sixth tier and winning promotion to the 2019 4. divisjon. The league being suspended in 2020 because of the pandemic, in 2021 he became player developer in Sandnes Ulf's youth ranks.

Career statistics

References

External links
Real Maryland Monarchs bio

1985 births
Living people
People from Sola, Norway
Norwegian footballers
Viking FK players
Skeid Fotball players
Stavanger IF players
Real Maryland F.C. players
Sandnes Ulf players
Norwegian First Division players
USL Second Division players
Eliteserien players
Norwegian expatriate footballers
Expatriate soccer players in the United States
Norwegian expatriate sportspeople in the United States
Association football defenders

Sportspeople from Rogaland